Tom Doran (born 7 August 1987) is a Welsh professional boxer. He held the WBC International middleweight title in 2016, and has challenged once for the British middleweight title in the same year. Outside of boxing, Doran works as an aircraft maintenance technician.

Amateur career
Doran fought as an amateur for Shotton Amateur Boxing Club, in the welterweight division.

Professional career
On 23 May 2009, Doran made his professional debut in a four-round points decision victory over Alex Spitko. After defeating Max Maxwell via first-round stoppage on 20 May 2011, Doran would not fight for three years. He returned to the ring on 24 May 2014 to score a six-round points decision over Harry Matthews. On 14 February 2015, Doran won the Prizefighter middleweight tournament, earning £32,000 after stopping Cello Renda in the third round of the final.

Doran won his first regional championship—the vacant WBC International middleweight title—in an action-packed two rounds against Luke Keeler on 2 April 2016. In round one, both fighters scored knockdowns; Doran went on to finish Keeler in the second round with two further knockdowns. On 25 June 2016, Doran faced British middleweight champion Chris Eubank Jr. on the undercard of Anthony Joshua vs. Dominic Breazeale, but was stopped (and knocked down four times) after four one-sided rounds.

Professional boxing record

References

External links

1987 births
Living people
Welsh male boxers
Middleweight boxers
People from Connah's Quay
Sportspeople from Flintshire
Welterweight boxers
Prizefighter contestants